Municipal elections were held on November 13, 1978 in the Regional Municipality of Ottawa-Carleton (RMOC), Ontario, Canada. This page lists the election results for local mayors, reeves, councils and hydro commissions of the RMOC in 1978.

Cumberland

Reeve

Council
Four to be elected

Gloucester

Reeve

Deputy reeve

Council
(Five to be elected)

Hydro commission
(Two to be elected)

Goulbourn

Mayor

Council

Kanata

Referendum
This was the first municipal election in Kanata's history, which amalgamated March Township with parts of Nepean and Goulbourn. As the city had yet to be named, voters voted in a referendum to choose the new city's name. Kanata was the choice of a plurality of voters, thanks to winning the support of voters in March Township.

Mayor

Council

Nepean

Reeve

Deputy Reeve

Council
(Five to be elected)

Hydro commission
(Four to be elected)

Osgoode

Reeve

Council
Four to be elected

Ottawa

Mayor

Rideau

Mayor

Council
Two to be elected from each ward

Rockcliffe Park

Referendum
Voters were asked if they were in favour of licensed liquor premises in the village, which would make the village "wet".

Reeve

Council
Four to be elected

Vanier

Mayor

Council
Two elected from each ward

West Carleton

Mayor

Council 
Two to be elected from each ward

References

Municipal elections in Ottawa
1978 elections in Canada